Governor Lewis may refer to:

Allen Montgomery Lewis (1909–1993), Governor-General of Saint Lucia several times between 1974 and 1987
David P. Lewis (1820–1884), 23rd Governor of Alabama
James T. Lewis (1819–1904), 9th Governor of Wisconsin
Meriwether Lewis (1774–1809), 2nd Governor of Louisiana Territory
Morgan Lewis (governor) (1754–1844), 3rd Governor of New York